The Nepal National Teachers Association (NNTA) is an organization of teachers' trade unions in Nepal. It is the first and the most influential organization of teachers' association in Nepal. The NNTA was established in 1979 and registered under the educational act of that time, and then become a trade union.  Currently, it has more than 70 thousand members.  NNTA has established international relation and is the first member to the WCOTP from Nepal, and a charter member to Education International (EI) global union federation. NNTA is also affiliated or has working relationships with the trade unions and professional organizations in Nepal and around the world. NNTA has a close relationship with the Communist Party of Nepal (Unified Marxist-Leninist).

The 12th national general convention of the NNTA took place from 30-31, May 2018. A 33-member central working committee was elected at the convention. The gathering elected Laxman Sharma as NNTA chairperson.

References

Educational organisations based in Nepal
Education trade unions
Trade unions in Nepal
Trade unions established in 1979
Teaching in Nepal
1979 establishments in Nepal